Green's Farms station is a commuter rail stop on the Metro-North Railroad's New Haven Line, located in Westport, Connecticut.

Station layout
The station has two high-level side platforms, each six cars long. The northern platform, adjacent to Track 3, is generally used by westbound trains. The southern platform, adjacent to Track 4, is generally used by eastbound trains. The New Haven Line has four tracks at this location. The two inner tracks, not adjacent to either platform, are used only by express trains. 

The station has 466 parking spaces, all owned by the state. Interstate 95 borders the parking lots to the north of the station on either side of New Creek Road.

Like other station houses on the New Haven Line, the one at Green's Farms is on the north side of the tracks, just east of New Creek Road, which runs beneath a railroad bridge. Access to the south side of the tracks is down a wooden staircase, under the railroad bridge at New Creek Road, and up another wooden staircase. Part of the platform near the station house is covered, and on the east end of the north platform another, rusty metal canopy covers a small area. A ticket machine is on the north platform near the station house. Bicycle stands are located to the east of the station house. On the south side of the tracks, a standard see-through shelter seats eight.

References

External links

 Visual Inspection Report for the station (January 2007), from the state Department of Transportation
 Bureau of Public Transportation of the Connecticut Department of Transportation, "Condition Inspection for the Westport Station" report dated October 2006
 Station from I-95 from Google Maps Street View
 http://www.ct.gov/dot/lib/dot/documents/dpt/1_Station_Inspection_Summary_Report.pdf

Metro-North Railroad stations in Connecticut
Stations on the Northeast Corridor
Stations along New York, New Haven and Hartford Railroad lines
Railroad stations in Fairfield County, Connecticut
Buildings and structures in Westport, Connecticut